Zinc finger protein 268 is a protein that in humans is encoded by the ZNF268 gene.

References

Further reading